The Roman Catholic Diocese of Yarmouth was a Roman Catholic diocese that includes part of the Province of Nova Scotia. It was erected on July 6, 1953. The Diocese of Yarmouth covered 32,150 square kilometers. In December 2011, it was merged with the Archdiocese of Halifax to create the Archdiocese of Halifax-Yarmouth.

Diocesan bishops
The following is a list of the bishops of Yarmouth, and their terms of service:
 Albert Leménager (1953-1967)
 Austin-Emile Burke (1968-1991)
 James Matthew Wingle  (1993-2001)

References

External links
Diocese of Yarmouth official site
Diocese of Yarmouth page at catholichierarchy.org retrieved July 18, 2006

Yarmouth
Catholic Church in Nova Scotia
Annapolis County, Nova Scotia
Digby County, Nova Scotia
Kings County, Nova Scotia
Shelburne County, Nova Scotia
Yarmouth, Nova Scotia

it:Diocesi di Yarmouth